Wheatley Heights is a census-designated place (CDP) in Suffolk County, New York. The population was 5,130 at the 2010 census. The CDP, located in the Town of Babylon, is named after the hamlet in the same general vicinity.

In the past, some or all Wheatley Heights was proposed to become part of the never-realized Incorporated Village of Half Hollow Hills.

History
Wheatley Heights historically was part of the hamlet of Wyandanch, and shares a ZIP code and fire brigade with it. The name Wyandanch was changed to Wheatley Heights by the Postmaster of Wyandanch Thomas A. Brown. 

Circa 2001, Wheatley Heights and its neighbors Dix Hills, East Farmingdale, and Melville (all partially or wholly within the Half Hollow Hills Central School District) proposed incorporating as a single village called the Incorporated Village of Half Hollow Hills. These plans failed and each remain unincorporated hamlets to this day.

Geography

Wheatley Heights is bordered by Dix Hills to the northeast, East Farmingdale to the west, Deer Park to the east, Wyandanch to the south, and Melville to the northwest.

Demographics

As of the census of 2000, and there were 5,013 people, 1,455 households, and 1,223 families residing in the CDP. The population density was 3,704.7 per square mile (1,433.7/km2). There were 1,494 housing units at an average density of 1,104.1/sq mi (427.3/km2). The racial makeup of the CDP was 40.00% White, 48.41% Black or African American, 0.30% Native American, 3.41% Asian, 4.15% from other races, and 3.73% from two or more races. Hispanic or Latino of any race were 11.67% of the population.

There were 1,455 households, out of which 43.6% had children under the age of 18 living with them, 62.2% were married couples living together, 17.0% had a female householder with no husband present, and 15.9% were non-families. 13.0% of all households were made up of individuals, and 5.2% had someone living alone who was 65 years of age or older. The average household size was 3.42 and the average family size was 3.67.

In the CDP, the population was spread out, with 30.3% under the age of 18, 8.1% from 18 to 24, 29.9% from 25 to 44, 23.8% from 45 to 64, and 7.9% who were 65 years of age or older. The median age was 35 years. For every 100 females, there were 95.1 males. For every 100 females age 18 and over, there were 89.3 males.

The median income for a household in the CDP was $99,583. The per capita income for the CDP was $30,726. About 3.4% of families and 4.8% of the population were below the poverty line, including 7.6% of those under age 18 and 8.3% of those age 65 or over.

Notable people

Notable residents have included  Washington Redskins football player Stephen Bowen, Assemblywoman Kimberly Jean-Pierre, and all four members of 90's boy-band and R&B song-sation Soul 4 Real.

References 

Babylon (town), New York
Census-designated places in New York (state)
Hamlets in New York (state)
Census-designated places in Suffolk County, New York
Hamlets in Suffolk County, New York